Bruno Brigido de Oliveira (born 9 March 1991), known as Bruno Brigido, is a Brazilian footballer who plays for Portuguese club Estrela da Amadora as a goalkeeper.

Club career
Born in Criciúma, Santa Catarina, Bruno graduated with hometown's Criciúma. During his spell at the youth setup he was also a squash player, but chose football.

On 24 September 2011 Bruno made his professional debut, starting in a 0–2 away loss against Boa Esporte for the Série B championship. He spent the whole campaign as a third-choice, however. Bruno was elected as first-choice in 2013, and made his Série A debut on 26 May, playing the full 90 minutes in a  3–1 home win against Bahia.

On 11 March 2015, Bruno signed a four-year deal with fellow league team Coritiba. He appeared in ten league matches for Coritiba between May and July.

At the start of 2016, Bruno joined XV de Piracicaba on loan for the 2016 Campeonato Paulista. He participated in twelve matches in the aforementioned competition for Piracicaba before leaving on 12 April.

Career statistics

Honours
Criciúma
Campeonato Catarinense: 2013

References

External links
Coritiba official profile 

1991 births
Living people
Sportspeople from Santa Catarina (state)
Brazilian footballers
Association football goalkeepers
Campeonato Brasileiro Série A players
Campeonato Brasileiro Série B players
Criciúma Esporte Clube players
Coritiba Foot Ball Club players
Esporte Clube XV de Novembro (Piracicaba) players
C.D. Feirense players
C.F. Estrela da Amadora players
Primeira Liga players
Liga Portugal 2 players
Brazilian expatriate footballers
Expatriate footballers in Portugal
Brazilian expatriate sportspeople in Portugal